"Lost Stars" is an original song performed by Maroon 5 frontman Adam Levine for the romantic comedy-drama film Begin Again. It was released on June 23, 2014, through ALXNDR, 222 Records, Polydor, and Interscope in the United States.

The song was written and produced by Gregg Alexander, Danielle Brisebois, Nick Lashley and Nick Southwood. It was recorded in New York City at Electric Lady Studios in mid-2012. "Lost Stars" also includes two versions, one for actress Keira Knightley and the other by Levine titled "Into the Night Mix", which are included on the film's soundtrack, with the original version appearing on the deluxe edition of Maroon 5's fifth studio album V (2014). Levine is also noted for his falsetto usage in the chorus.

"Lost Stars" was performed live for the first time on the season finale of The Voice's season seven by Levine and his team member Matt McAndrew. Their performance peaked at number 83 on the US Billboard Hot 100. Later, Levine performed the song with his band Maroon 5 at the 87th Academy Awards on February 22, 2015.

Music videos

Adam Levine version
A lyric video of the song by Adam Levine was released on June 30, 2014. It follows the scenes from Begin Again, with the film's character Dave Kohl (portrayed by Levine).

An acoustic version of the song was released on August 29, 2014. The video shows Levine performing the song in a recording studio with Maroon 5 member James Valentine playing the guitar. This version does not appear on the film's soundtrack.

Keira Knightley version
Another lyric video of the song by Keira Knightley was released on June 26, 2014. Like the first lyric video, it follows with another character Gretta James (portrayed by Knightley).

Animated lyric video
An animated lyric video version of "Lost Stars" was performed by New Radicals (with members themselves Gregg Alexander and Danielle Brisebois) premiered execlusively on Deadline website, February 16, 2015.

Charts

Certifications

Accolades
"Lost Stars" was nominated for a 2015 Critics Choice Award for Best Original Song, but lost to "Glory" by John Legend and Common from Selma. The song was also nominated for Best Original Song at the 2015 Academy Awards, where it also lost to "Glory". However, the song did win Best Original Song in a Feature Film at the Hollywood Music in Media Awards.

Stevie McCrorie version

In April 2015, Stevie McCrorie, winner of the fourth series of The Voice UK, released a cover version of "Lost Stars" as his winner's single.

On 4 April 2015, McCrorie performed the song "Lost Stars" live on The Voice UK grand final, with the single being released the next day as a digital download. It reached number 6 on the UK Singles Chart and number 1 in his native Scotland the following week.

Chart performance

Release history

References

2014 songs
Adam Levine songs
Animated music videos
Songs written by Danielle Brisebois
Songs written by Gregg Alexander
Song recordings produced by Gregg Alexander
Songs written for films
Songs written by Nick Southwood
Number-one singles in Scotland